John Graham is a Canadian politician, who was elected mayor of Iqaluit, Nunavut in the 2012 municipal election.

Prior to being elected mayor, Graham worked as manager of the Iqaluit Airport.

In June 2014, Graham stepped down from the mayor's position. Deputy mayor Mary Wilman served as acting mayor after his resignation, until being selected as mayor in a council vote on November 25.

References

Mayors of Iqaluit
Living people
21st-century Canadian politicians
Year of birth missing (living people)